Simon Ligot (born 24 March 1993) is a Belgian defender who currently plays for Liège.

External links
 Player profile at MLSZ 
 

1993 births
Living people
Sportspeople from Namur (city)
Belgian footballers
Belgium youth international footballers
Association football defenders
Standard Liège players
Újpest FC players
Nemzeti Bajnokság I players
Belgian expatriate footballers
Expatriate footballers in Hungary
Belgian expatriate sportspeople in Hungary
Footballers from Namur (province)